Eau or EAU may refer to:

 The French word for water
 Eau (trigraph), a trigraph of the Latin script
 EAU, the IATA code for the Chippewa Valley Regional Airport in Wisconsin, United States
 East Africa University, a private university in Puntland, Somalia
 El Asher University, an undergraduate university in the Sharqia Governorate, Egypt
 Emergency assessment unit (EAU), a short-stay department in a hospital
 Estimated annual usage (EAU)
 European Association of Urology, a non-profit organisation of urology professionals
 Initiative: Eau, an American nonprofit, non-governmental organization
 River Eau, a tributary of the River Trent in Lincolnshire, England